The Bainbridge-class destroyers were a class of United States Navy Torpedo Boat Destroyers (TBDs) built between 1899 and 1903. The first class so designated, they comprised the first 13 of 16 TBDs authorized by Congress in 1898 following the Spanish–American War. One ship of the class was lost at sea during service in World War I: , which collided with the British merchant ship SS Rose in 1917.

Subclasses
Some sources subdivide the Bainbridge class into subsidiary classes based on their builders' differing designs.
 the first five vessels - Bainbridge, Barry, Chauncey, Dale and Decatur - shared a raised forecastle and had two widely-spaced pairs of funnels.
 Hopkins and  had a turtledeck forward and may be considered to be Hopkins class. These had their two single torpedo tubes replaced by two twin torpedo tubes during World War I; total torpedoes remained at four.
  and  had a turtledeck forward, Fore River boilers, carried their funnels in only one group of four, and may be considered to be Lawrence class. In 1906 two additional 6-pounder guns were substituted for the two 3-inch guns to save weight.
 ,  and  carried one twin torpedo tube instead of two singles beginning in World War I and may be considered to be Paul Jones class.

Design

Origins
Stringham, the largest of these, was larger than some contemporary British destroyers. However, at  the Bainbridges were considerably larger and had a significantly greater gun armament than the four 6-pounders of the torpedo boats.

The Bainbridge class were produced on the recommendation of an 1898 war plans board formed to prosecute the Spanish–American War and chaired by Assistant Secretary of the Navy Theodore Roosevelt. The poor sea-keeping qualities of existing torpedo boats (such as the  ) and the existence of Spanish torpedo boat destroyers (such as the  ) were cited as reasons for the US to build its own destroyers. The 13 Bainbridges were officially designated as the Navy's first TBDs when authorized by an Act of Congress on 4 May 1898 under the fiscal year 1899 program (with the remaining three being ).

Due to construction difficulties the Bainbridges were completed 1901–02, thus too late for the Spanish–American War. However, the destroyer type was instituted in the US Navy, as it had been in the Royal Navy around 1895 with the A-class destroyers. No further torpedo boats were constructed for the US Navy until the outbreak of World War II in Europe, and by then they had no design relationship to destroyers (see PT boats). The Imperial German Navy of 1898–1918 used the term "torpedo boat" for anything up to a large destroyer in size.

Armament
At 420 long tons normal displacement, the Bainbridges were twice as big as most previous torpedo boats. The extra displacement was used for a greatly increased gun armament and a sufficient engineering plant to rival the torpedo boats in speed ( vs. ). The torpedo armament remained at two  torpedo tubes; although the torpedo boat's mission was being transferred to the destroyer, apparently increased gun armament was more important to the designers than increased torpedo armament.

The gun armament of two /50 caliber guns and five 6-pounder guns was a great increase over the four 6-pounder guns of the torpedo boat Farragut. It reflected a desire to quickly disable torpedo boats before they could get within range of friendly battleships. Future destroyer classes included progressive increases in armament.

The class was equipped with one or two depth charge racks during World War I for the anti-submarine mission.

Engineering
The best available technologies of coal-fired boilers and triple-expansion engines were used for propulsion, although steam turbines would be adopted in the next generation of US destroyers, beginning with the  launched in 1908. The need for faster destroyers was to be a significant driver of naval propulsion technology throughout the type's future development.

Bainbridge had four Thornycroft boilers supplying  steam to two triple-expansion engines totaling  (design).

Hopkins also had four Thornycroft boilers supplying steam to two triple-expansion engines totaling 7,000 ihp (design).

Lawrence had four Normand boilers supplying steam to two triple-expansion engines totaling  (design). She made  on trials 8,400 ihp. Normal coal capacity was even lower, at only .

An interesting note on destroyers is that they have continuously increased in size since their inception. The Bainbridges were under  full load; some s in service in 2013 displace  full load, more than the standard displacement limit on 1920s  "Treaty cruisers".

Service
A few Bainbridges were deployed to the Philippines 1904-1917. During the US participation in World War I, these were redeployed to the Mediterranean as convoy escorts. Others of the class served in the Atlantic, on the US East Coast, or guarded the Panama Canal. Chauncey collided with the British merchant ship SS Rose in 1917 and was lost. Following the Armistice, the remainder were sold for scrapping or merchant conversion in 1920.

Ships in class
Note that, although the ships are listed below with the prefix "DD-" before their official numbers, this classification was not created until 1911, and until then these vessels were officially categorised as "Destroyer No. 1" to "Destroyer No. 13".

See also

References

Bibliography
 
 
 
 Simpson, Richard V. Building The Mosquito Fleet, The US Navy's First Torpedo Boats. Charleston, South Carolina:Arcadia Publishing, 2001, .

External links
 Tin Can Sailors @ Destroyers.org - Bainbridge class destroyer 
 Tin Can Sailors @ Destroyers.org - Hopkins class destroyer 
 Tin Can Sailors @ Destroyers.org - Lawrence class destroyer 
 Tin Can Sailors @ Destroyers.org - Destroyer classes 
 DestroyerHistory.org Bainbridge class destroyer
 DestroyerHistory.org Hopkins class destroyer
 DestroyerHistory.org Lawrence class destroyer
 DestroyerHistory.org First US destroyers
 NavSource Destroyer Photo Index Page
 DiGiulian, Tony Navweaps.com Pre-WWII US Torpedoes
 DiGiulian, Tony Navweaps.com 3"/50 Mks 2, 3, 5, 6, and 8
 DiGiulian, Tony Navweaps.com USN 6 pdr Mks 1 through 13
 US Navy Torpedo History, part 2 

 

Destroyer classes